Eugenio Klein (born January 17, 1982) is an Argentine soccer player who last played for Mar del Plata Athletics. Klein plays primarily as an attacking midfielder, but he is also used as a winger or forward.

Professional career

Loans

Trials

References

External links
 Eugenio Klein, el nuevo refuerzo.
 

1982 births
Living people
Sportspeople from Mar del Plata
Argentine footballers
Argentine expatriate footballers
Expatriate footballers in Honduras
Expatriate footballers in Indonesia
Association football wingers
Liga 1 (Indonesia) players
Ferro Carril Oeste footballers
Club Atlético River Plate footballers
F.C. Motagua players
Argentine people of Volga German descent